The A23 is a major road in Kenya linking the towns of Voi and Taveta, before crossing the Tanzanian border (where it ceases to be classified as the A23) and serving the towns of Moshi and Arusha. The Taveta branch of the Uganda Railway runs along the road.

Towns 
The following towns, listed from east towards the west, are located along the highway. 

Voi (junction to A109 road)
Mwatate
Bura
Mashoti
Maktau
Mbuyuni
Taveta (border town to Tanzania)

See also 
 Trans-African Highway network

References

Roads in Kenya